The Tokcha' Pillbox is a Japanese-built World War II-era defensive fortification on the island of Guam. It is a roughly rectangular structure built out of steel-reinforced concrete filled with coral and beach aggregate. The entrance is on the north wall, sheltered by a wall of coral blocks, and the gun port is on the south wall. This structure was built under the direction of the Japanese military during their occupation of the island 1941–44.

The pillbox was listed on the National Register of Historic Places in 1991.

See also
National Register of Historic Places listings in Guam

References

Buildings and structures on the National Register of Historic Places in Guam
World War II on the National Register of Historic Places in Guam
1940s establishments in Guam
Talofofo, Guam
Pillboxes (military)